Unfair World (translit. Adikos kosmos) is a 2011 Greek drama film directed by Filippos Tsitos. 

Tsitos won the award for Best Director and Antonis Kafetzopoulos won the award for Best Actor at the San Sebastián International Film Festival. The film was selected as the Greek entry for the Best Foreign Language Oscar at the 85th Academy Awards, but it did not make the final shortlist. The film also won the Best Film award at the 3rd Hellenic Film Academy Awards.

Cast
 Antonis Kafetzopoulos as Sotiris
 Christos Stergioglou as Minas
 Theodora Tzimou as Dora
 Minas Hatzisavvas
 Efthymis Papadimitriou as Dimitriou (as Makis Papadimitriou)
 Yorgos Souxes as Inspector
 Laya Yourgou as 40-year-old woman
 Myrna Tsapa as Georgia
 Sofia Seirli as Lena

See also
 List of submissions to the 85th Academy Awards for Best Foreign Language Film
 List of Greek submissions for the Academy Award for Best Foreign Language Film

References

External links
 

2011 films
2011 drama films
Greek drama films
2010s Greek-language films